= Don Falls =

Coordinates: 48°8′39″N 40°2′40″E

- Донские водопады (Russian)
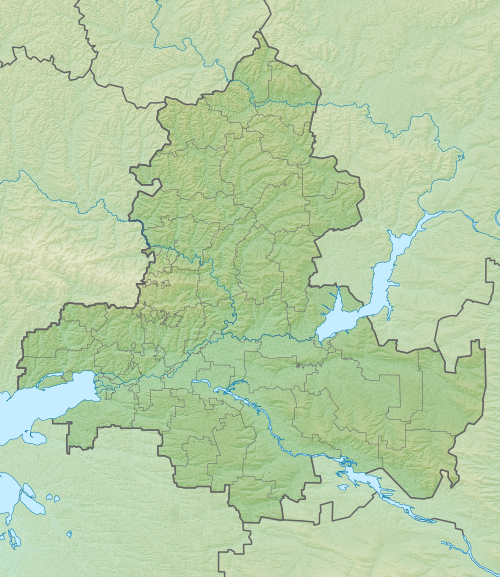
- Location within Rostov Oblast Location within Russia
- Type: Fortress and Museum
- Location: Rostov oblast Russia

Site notes
- Area: 48°08′39″ 40°02′40″

Don Falls, which are also known as Volchenskiy Falls, are waterfalls, located near the Uglerodovsky settlement in Rostov region. One of the waterfalls is called “Kosy”("Spits") other is “Dve Slezy” "Two tears". The Falls are located on the territory of ex Zamchalovsky quarry.

Several Don Falls are sited in Rostov region near the Uglerodovsky settlement. All of them are situated on the place of the ex Zamchalovsky quarry. The waterfall called “Kosy”("Spits") is on the eastern part of canyon and on the opposite of it there is “Dve slezy” ("Two tears"), which height reaches 10 meters. The water from the first waterfall flows smoothly down, the water from another one falls from a big height to a stones, on which has the marks by water.

The administration of Volchenskiy settlement wished that eventually Don Falls could receive a status of a natural monument and that place would become one of the sight of tourist route in Rostov region. For 2017 year, special excursions in this place aren`t held.
